Fakhr al-Mulk was a Persian bureaucrat, who served as the vizier of the Seljuk sultan Berkyaruq from 1095 to 1099, and later vizier of the Sejluk prince and ruler of Khurasan, Ahmad Sanjar, from 1101 to 1106. He was the eldest son of the prominent Seljuk vizier Nizam al-Mulk.

References

Sources
 
 
 
 
 
 
 
 

11th-century Iranian people
12th-century Iranian people
Viziers of the Seljuk Empire
1043 births
1106 deaths